Pentti Hakkarainen may refer to one of the following:
 Pentti Ensio Hakkarainen, educational psychologist of Finnish origin
 , Finnish banker